Chariclo ( or) is either of two nymphs in Greek mythology:
 Chariclo, a nymph who was married to the centaur Chiron and became the mother of Hippe, Endeïs, Ocyrhoe, and Carystus. In some accounts, she was described as the daughter of Apollo, Perses or Oceanus. Chariclo together with her mother-in-law Philyra the Oceanid, were the nurses of the young Achilles.
 Chariclo, a nymph devotee of Athena, who became pregnant by a shepherd, Everes, giving birth to the prophet Tiresias. Tiresias was struck blind by Athena after seeing her naked. Chariclo begged Athena to give Tiresias his sight back, but the goddess could not undo her curse. She gave him the gift of prophecy instead.

Notes

References 
 Pindar, Odes translated by Diane Arnson Svarlien. 1990. Online version at the Perseus Digital Library.
 Pindar, The Odes of Pindar including the Principal Fragments with an Introduction and an English Translation by Sir John Sandys, Litt.D., FBA. Cambridge, MA., Harvard University Press; London, William Heinemann Ltd. 1937. Greek text available at the Perseus Digital Library.
 Pseudo-Apollodorus, The Library with an English Translation by Sir James George Frazer, F.B.A., F.R.S. in 2 Volumes, Cambridge, MA, Harvard University Press; London, William Heinemann Ltd. 1921. Online version at the Perseus Digital Library. Greek text available from the same website.

Nymphs
Children of Apollo
Demigods in classical mythology
Metamorphoses characters